The Byfjord Tunnel is a subsea road tunnel in Rogaland county, Norway. The  tunnel runs between the village of Grødem on the mainland in Randaberg municipality and the island of Sokn in Stavanger municipality, running underneath the Byfjorden. The tunnel was built as part of the Rennesøy Fixed Link project which opened in 1992 with the goal of connecting all the islands of Rennesøy to the mainland. The tunnel was a toll road from 1992 until 2006. The tunnel is part of European route E39 highway. The tunnel was Europe's longest and the world's deepest tunnel upon its completion, it was surpassed by a deeper tunnel in 1994 and a longer tunnel in 1999. The tunnel had an average daily traffic of 9,717 vehicles in 2018.

References

Subsea tunnels in Norway
Road tunnels in Rogaland
Randaberg
Stavanger
European route E39 in Norway
1992 establishments in Norway
Tunnels completed in 1992
Former toll tunnels